Two cruisers of the Imperial Russian Navy have been called Pamiat Merkuria:

 , a French-built ship originally commissioned as Yaroslavl and hulked in 1907.

Russian Navy ship names